Haibat Khan's Mosque is a medieval mosque in Ahmedabad, India.

History and architecture

The mosque is located to south-west of Dastur Khan's Mosque near Jamalpur gate. It was built by Haibat Khan (also known as Masti Khan), one of Ahmed Shah I's nobles and paternal uncle, almost entirely of Hindu-Jain temple material. Though of little beauty, this mosque is one of the earliest attempts to combine Islamic and Hindu elements of architecture. The front wall is plain, pierced by three small pointed arches; the minarets small and without ornament, rise from the roof; and, with a dwarfed and unlighted clerestory, the centre is barely raised above the side domes. Inside, in the centre, is a dome with beautiful carvings that was once part of a temple mandapa, and pillars taken from different Hindu temples with variety of rich ornament.

References 

Mosques in Ahmedabad
Monuments of National Importance in Gujarat